The 1945 Ball State Cardinals football team was an American football team that represented Ball State Teachers College (later renamed Ball State University) in the Indiana Intercollegiate Conference (IIC) during the 1945 college football season. In their 10th season under head coach John Magnabosco, the Cardinals compiled a 4–1–1 record, finished in third place out of 10 teams in the IIC, and outscored opponents by a total of 119 to 27.

Schedule

References

Ball State
Ball State Cardinals football seasons
Ball State Cardinals football